"Tokyo I'm on My Way" is the second single by J-pop duo Puffy AmiYumi from their Splurge album, that has been released on May 24, 2006. It was co-written by the Offspring's Dexter Holland. Both lyrics and melody of the chorus were taken from the song "Tokyo" by Dutch band Gruppo Sportivo.

Track listing  
 Tokyo I'm on My Way
 Puffy AmiYumi: Vocals
 Takahiro Konagawa (from Charcoal Filter): Guitar
 Seiji Kameda: Bass
 Masayuki Muraishi: Drums
 世界のはじっこ (Sekai no hajikko)
 Friends Forever ～FICKLR Remix～

References

2006 singles
Puffy AmiYumi songs
Song recordings produced by Seiji Kameda
2006 songs
Ki/oon Music singles